Sydney Hall is an American actor, model and dancer.

Education
Hall completed his schooling at Northwest Catholic High School in West Hartford, Connecticut in 1991. He subsequently attended Howard University in Washington, D.C., where he obtained a BA. He is a member of the Alpha Phi Alpha fraternity.

South Africa
In 1994, Hall travelled to Soweto in Johannesburg, South Africa as part of the Step Afrika! stepping dance troupe of fraternity brothers. He lived in South Africa for several years, working as a model and actor. He also owned a nightclub there. He played the character Dr CL Phunk in a series of retro television commercials commencing in 2002 for the Chicken Licken fast-food restaurant chain.

Filmography

Film
Lord of War (2005)
The Deal (2008)
Caught in the Crossfire (2010)

Television
Coup! (2006)
Generation Kill (2008)
Intelligence: "The Grey Hat" (2014)

References

External links

Sydney Hall – TVGuide.com

Living people
African-American male actors
African-American male dancers
African-American dancers
American male dancers
African-American male models
African-American models
American male models
American male film actors
American male television actors
Howard University alumni
Place of birth missing (living people)
1975 births
21st-century African-American people
20th-century African-American people